Soul Quest Overdrive is an American adult animated television series that aired on Cartoon Network's late night programming block, Adult Swim. Soul Quest Overdrive is a spin-off of the Adult Swim series Aqua Teen Hunger Force. It was created by Aqua Teen Hunger Force creators Matt Maiellaro and Dave Willis. It made its formal debut and ended on May 24, 2011, leaving two episodes unaired. The series is about the misadventures of four anthropomorphic pieces of sports equipment.

Premise 
The series is about the misadventures of four anthropomorphic pieces of sports equipment: Mick, Mortimer, Bert, and Tammy, who live together in a mobile home. Despite being Evangelical Christians, they are also hedonistic drug addicts prone to extremely impulsive and destructive behavior.

Characters
 Bert (David Cross) – an impulsive bowling pin.
 Mortimer (H. Jon Benjamin) – a baseball glove who seems more grounded than the rest of the group.
 Tammy (Kristen Schaal) – an abused basketball.
 Mick (Gavin McInnes) – a wild energetic Scottish soccer ball.

Production 
Soul Quest Overdrive was created by Matt Maiellaro and Dave Willis. It was picked up for six episodes in 2010.

The series is a spin-off of the Adult Swim series Aqua Teen Hunger Force, which was also created by Maiellaro and Willis. The characters originated as one-time characters from the Aqua Teen Hunger Force season five episode "Bible Fruit", which originally aired on March 23, 2008. "Bible Fruit" features the main characters from Soul Quest Overdrive (with the exception of Mick) in the form of anthropomorphic fruits. The fruit characters from "Bible Fruit" were changed to pieces of anthropomorphic sports equipment in Soul Quest Overdrive, but maintained similar personalities and their original names. In "Bible Fruit" the fruit versions of the characters were voiced by the same voice actors who would go on to voice their respective sports equipment counterparts in Soul Quest Overdrive.

The character Mick does not appear in the pilot episode and did not have a counterpart in "Bible Fruit". Gavin McInnes, who provided the voice of Mick, was personally approached by Adult Swim and asked to play the voice of Mick, who has a thick Scottish accent on the show (McInnes himself is Canadian, of Glaswegian ancestry, but does not speak with a Scottish accent in real life).

Broadcast history 
"Meals on Wheels" was originally released online in early 2010, as part of a pilot contest in which viewers could watch several different pilots and vote on which would be best to air. It ultimately lost to the pilot of Cheyenne Cinnamon and the Fantabulous Unicorn of Sugar Town Candy Fudge, which aired on March 29, 2010. Although Cheyenne Cinnamon and the Fantabulous Unicorn of Sugar Town Candy Fudge won the contest it was never picked up for a full series, unlike Soul Quest Overdrive.

Three episodes from the first season originally premiered in Adult Swim's "DVR Theater" on May 24, 2011, alongside the television debut of "Meals on Wheels". No further episodes have been released following the show's debut on May 24, 2011, although the original still-unaired pilot has been made available online. Two episodes were never aired or released to the public in any format.

Episodes

Pilot (2009)

Season 1 (2011)

References

External links
 

2010s American adult animated television series
2010s American sitcoms
2011 American television series debuts
2011 American television series endings
American adult animated comedy television series
American adult animated sports television series
American adult animated television spin-offs
American animated sitcoms
Aqua Teen Hunger Force
English-language television shows
Adult Swim original programming
Fictional balls
Television series by Williams Street